Oinophila nesiotes is a moth of the family Tineidae. It is found on the Canary Islands.

The wingspan is 8–9 mm. The forewings are dark olivaceous brown with two shining pale ochreous transverse fasciae. The hindwings are bronzy brownish with a few iridescent metallic scales.

The larvae possibly feed on dead leaves.

References

Hieroxestinae
Endemic insects of the Canary Islands
Moths described in 1908
Moths of Africa
Taxa named by Thomas de Grey, 6th Baron Walsingham